List of things named after William Rowan Hamilton:

 Cayley–Hamilton theorem
 Hamilton's equations
 Hamilton's principle
 Hamilton–Jacobi equation
 Hamilton–Jacobi–Bellman equation, related equation in control theory
 Hamilton–Jacobi–Einstein equation

Hamiltonian

In both mathematics and  physics (specifically mathematical physics):

the term Hamiltonian refers to any energy function defined by a Hamiltonian vector field, a particular vector field on a symplectic manifold; for related concepts see Hamiltonian (control theory) in control theory and  Hamiltonian (quantum mechanics).

In physics and chemistry:
 Molecular Hamiltonian
In chemistry:
 Dyall Hamiltonian

More specifically, as an adjective it is used in the phrases:

In  mathematical physics:
 Hamiltonian flow
 Hamiltonian function
 Hamiltonian mechanics in classical mechanics
 Hamiltonian optics
 Hamiltonian principle, see Hamilton's principle
 Hamiltonian system
 Hamiltonian vector field

In mathematics:

 Hamiltonian path, in graph theory
 Hamiltonian cycle, a special case of a Hamiltonian path
 Hamiltonian group, in group theory
 Hamiltonian matrix
 Hamiltonian numbers (or quaternions)

In physics:
 Hamiltonian constraint
 Hamiltonian fluid mechanics
 Hamiltonian operator, see Hamiltonian (quantum mechanics)
 Hamiltonian lattice gauge theory

By field

In both mathematics and  physics (specifically mathematical physics):

the term Hamiltonian refers to any energy function defined by a Hamiltonian vector field, a particular vector field on a symplectic manifold, i.e.,  a Hamiltonian function;

 Hamiltonian field theory
 Hamiltonian flow
 Hamiltonian function, see above 
 Hamiltonian system
 Hamiltonian vector field
 Hamiltonian mechanics in classical mechanics
 Hamilton's principle
 Hamilton–Jacobi equation

In mathematics :
 Hamiltonian path, in graph theory
 Hamiltonian cycle, a special case of a Hamiltonian path
 Hamiltonian group, in group theory
 Hamiltonian matrix
 Hamiltonian numbers (or quaternions)

In physics and chemistry:
 Hamiltonian operator, see Hamiltonian (quantum mechanics)
 Molecular Hamiltonian

In physics:
 Hamiltonian constraint
 Hamiltonian fluid mechanics
 Hamiltonian lattice gauge theory

In Chemistry :
 Dyall Hamiltonian

In control theory:
 Hamiltonian (control theory)
 Hamilton–Jacobi–Bellman equation

Other 

 The Hamilton Building at Trinity College Dublin

See also 
Hamiltonian (disambiguation)

Hamilton
William Rowan Hamilton